William Edward Lewis Buttleman (born 20 April 2000) is an English cricketer, who bats right-handed and bowls right-arm off break. He represents Essex County Cricket Club in English domestic cricket. He completed his secondary education at Felsted School. His brother Joe Buttleman is also an English cricketer, who played for Durham MCC University.

He made his first-class debut on 3 June 2019, for Essex in the 2019 County Championship. He made his Twenty20 debut on June 11, 2021, for Essex in the 2021 T20 Blast. He made his List A debut on 22 July 2021, for Essex in the 2021 Royal London One-Day Cup.

References

External links
 

2000 births
Living people
English cricketers
Essex cricketers
Sportspeople from Chelmsford
English cricketers of the 21st century